Gopinathan Nair Venugopal (born 10 December 1960), popularly known as G. Venugopal, is an Indian playback singer known for his works in Malayalam films. He started his singing career in the film Odaruthammava Aalariyam (1984). Since then he has sung in more than 4000 films; and has over 500 private albums to his credit.

Early and personal life

Venugopal was born in Thattathumala, near Kilimanoor. Venugopal is the eldest of the two children of Gopinathan Nair, who hails from Thattathumala and Sarojini, who was the head of the department of music, Government College for Women, Thiruvananthapuram. K. Sharadamani and K. Radhamani, who were popularly known as Parur sisters, are the maternal aunts of Venugopal. Singers Sujatha Mohan and Radhika Thilak are his cousins and Shweta Mohan is his niece.

Venugopal married Reshmi on 8 April 1990 and they have two children, Arvind and Anupallavi. Arvind is also a playback singer.

Popular works

Television shows
As Judge

Awards

Kerala State Film Awards

 1988 - Best Male Playback Singer - Unarumee Gaanam (Moonnam Pakkam)
 1990 - Best Male Playback Singer - Thaane Poovitta Moham (Sasneham)
 2004 - Best Male Playback Singer - Aadadi Aadaadadi (Ullam)

Kerala Film Critics Association Awards

 1987 - Best Male Playback Singer - Onnam Ragam Paadi (Thoovanathumbikal)
 1989 - Best Male Playback Singer - Mainaka Ponmudiyil (Mazhavilkavadi)

Asianet Film Awards

 2006 - Best Playback Singer (Male) - Kainiraye (Baba Kalyani)

 2022 - Janmashtami Award by Balagokulam for Contributions in Art and Culture of Kairali. The youngest to get this award.

References

External links

Official website
Songs on Sand: G. Venugopal's blog 
Latest Devi Devotional from G. Venugopal

1960 births
Living people
Indian male playback singers
Kerala State Film Award winners
Tamil playback singers
Malayalam playback singers
Malayali people
Film musicians from Kerala
Singers from Thiruvananthapuram
People from Thiruvananthapuram
20th-century Indian singers
21st-century Indian singers
20th-century Indian male singers
21st-century Indian male singers